The 2003 Northwestern Wildcats football team represented Northwestern University during the 2003 NCAA Division I-A football season. They played their home games at Ryan Field and participated as members of the Big Ten Conference. They were coached by Randy Walker.

Schedule

Roster

References

External links
  NU Athletics 2003 Team Statistics

Northwestern
Northwestern Wildcats football seasons
Northwestern Wildcats football